Ranulph Neville, 1st Baron Neville (18 October 1262 – c. 18 April 1331) of Raby Castle, County Durham, was an English nobleman and head of the powerful Neville family.

Origins
He was the eldest son of Robert de Neville (who predeceased his own father) by his wife Mary FitzRanulf, one of the three daughters and co-heiresses of Ralph FitzRanulf (d.1270) of Middleham Castle in Yorkshire. Ranulph was heir to his grandfather Sir Robert de Neville (d.1282) of Raby.

Marriages and children
Neville married twice:

Firstly to  Euphemia de Clavering, daughter and heiress of John de Clavering of Warkworth Castle in Northumberland. By his wife he had fourteen children including:

Robert Neville (c. 1287 – June 1319), the "Peacock of the North", eldest son and heir apparent who predeceased his father, having been slain in a border fray outside the walls of Berwick by James 'The Good', Lord of Douglas (c.1290–1330). His cross-legged crusader-style effigy survives in St Brandon's Church, Brancepeth; 
Ralph Neville, 2nd Baron Neville (c.  1291 – 5 August 1367), eldest surviving son and heir;  
Sir Alexander Neville (d. 15 March 1367); 
John Neville (d. 19 July 1333) who died at the Battle of Halidon Hill; 
Thomas Neville (c. 1306 - before June 1349), Archdeacon of Durham. 
Anastasia Neville (c.1285), wife of Sir Walter Fauconberg (d. 24 June 1314) who died at the Battle of Bannockburn); 
Mary Neville; 
Ida Neville; 
Eupheme Neville.
Secondly he married Margery de Thwenge, daughter of John de Thwenge and Joan de Mauley. Her effigy survives in St Mary's Church, Staindrop.

Death and burial
Ranulph died shortly after 18 April 1331 and was buried in the choir of Coverham Abbey, the patronage of which had been inherited from his mother.

Footnotes

References 
 
 
 
 
 

1262 births
1331 deaths
13th-century English nobility
14th-century English nobility
Barons Neville of Raby
People from Staindrop